The Woman's Christian Temperance Union (WCTU) is an international temperance organization. It was among the first organizations of women devoted to social reform with a program that "linked the religious and the secular through concerted and far-reaching reform strategies based on applied Christianity." It plays an influential role in the temperance movement. Originating among women in the United States Prohibition movement, the organization supported the 18th Amendment and was also influential in social reform issues that came to prominence in the progressive era.

The WCTU was originally organized on December 23, 1873, in Hillsboro, Ohio, and officially declared at a national convention in Cleveland, Ohio, in 1874.  It operated at an international level and in the context of religion and reform, including missionary work and women's suffrage. Two years after its founding, the American WCTU sponsored an international conference at which the International Women's Christian Temperance Union was formed. The World's Woman's Christian Temperance Union was founded in 1883 and became the international arm of the organization, which has now affiliates in Australia, Canada, Germany, Finland, India, Japan, New Zealand, Norway, South Korea, United Kingdom, and the United States, among others.

The Woman's Christian Temperance Union conducts a White Ribbon Recruit (WRR) ceremony, in which babies are dedicated to the cause of temperance through a white ribbon being tied to their wrists, with their adult sponsors pledging to help the child live a life free from alcohol and other drugs.

History and purpose

Origins
At its founding in 1874, the stated purpose of the WCTU was to create a "sober and pure world" by abstinence, purity, and evangelical Christianity. Annie Wittenmyer was its first president. Wittenmyer was conservative in her goals for the movement focussing only on the question of alcohol consumption and avoiding involvement in politics. The constitution of the WCTU called for "the entire prohibition of the manufacture and sale of intoxicating liquors as a beverage."

Frances Willard, a noted feminist, was elected the WCTU's second president in 1879 and Willard grew the organization to be the largest organization of women in the world by 1890. She remained president until her death in 1898.

Its members were inspired by the Greek writer Xenophon, who defined temperance as "moderation in all things healthful; total abstinence from all things harmful." In other words, should something be good, it should not be indulged in to excess; should something be bad for you, it should be avoided altogether — thus their attempts to rid society of what they saw (and still see) as the dangers of alcohol.

The WCTU perceived alcohol as a cause and consequence of larger social problems rather than as a personal weakness or failing. The WCTU also advocated against tobacco. The American WCTU formed a "Department for the Overthrow of the Tobacco Habit" as early as 1885 and frequently published anti-tobacco articles in the 1880s. Agitation against tobacco continued through to the 1950s.

Policy interests
As a consequence of its stated purposes, the WCTU was also very interested in a number of social reform issues, including labor, prostitution, public health, sanitation, and international peace. As the movement grew in numbers and strength, members of the WCTU also focused on suffrage. The WCTU was instrumental in organizing woman's suffrage leaders and in helping more women become involved in American politics. Local chapters, known as "unions", were largely autonomous, though linked to state and national headquarters. Willard pushed for the "Home Protection" ballot, arguing that women, being the morally superior sex, needed the vote in order to act as "citizen-mothers" and protect their homes and cure society's ills. At a time when suffragists were viewed as radicals and alienated most American women, the WCTU offered a more traditionally feminine and "appropriate" organization for women to join.

Home Protection interests also extended to Labor rights, and an openness to Socialism. WCTU had a close association with the Knights of Labor, sharing goals for class harmony, sober and disciplined workers, and a day of rest. Concern for workers' conditions and the effect on family life led many members to also critique the exploitation of capital, as well as demand a living wage.

Although the WCTU had chapters throughout North America with hundreds of thousands of members, the "Christian" in its title was largely limited to those with an evangelical Protestant conviction and the importance of their role has been noted. The goal of evangelizing the world, according to this model, meant that very few Catholics, Jews, Muslims, Buddhists or Hindus were attracted to it, "even though the last three had a pronounced cultural and religious preference for abstinence". As the WCTU grew internationally, it developed various approaches that helped with the inclusion of women of religions other than Christianity. But, it was always primarily, and still is, a Christian women's organization.

The WCTU's work extended across a range of efforts to bring about personal and social moral reform. In the 1880s it worked on creating legislation to protect working girls from the exploitation of men, including raising Age of Consent laws. It also focused on keeping Sundays as Sabbath days and restrict frivolous activities. In 1901 the WCTU said that golf should not be allowed on Sundays.

The WCTU was also involved with efforts to alleviate poverty by discouraging the purchase of alcohol products. Through journal articles, the WCTU tried to prove that abstinence would help people move up in life. A fictional story in one of their journal articles illustrates this fact:

Ned has applied for a job, but he is not chosen. He finds that the potential employer has judged him to be like his Uncle Jack. Jack is a kindly man but he spends his money on drink and cigarettes. Ned has also been seen drinking and smoking. The employer thinks that Ned Fisher lacks the necessary traits of industriousness which he associates with abstinence and self-control.

Spread and influence
The Woman's Christian Temperance Union grew rapidly. The WCTU adopted Willard's "Do Everything" philosophy, which meant that the "W.C.T.U. campaigned for local, state, and national prohibition, woman suffrage, protective purity legislation, scientific temperance instruction in the schools, better working conditions for labor, anti-polygamy laws, Americanization, and a variety of other reforms" despite having the image of a gospel temperance organization. The presidential addresses of the WCTU provide excellent insight as to how the organization seamlessly blended issues of grass-roots organizing, temperance, education, immigration and cultural assimilation.

One prominent state chapter was the Minnesota Women's Christian Temperance Union. The Minnesota chapter's origin is rooted in nation's anti-saloon crusades of 1873 and 1874 where women all throughout the United States "joined together outside saloons to pray and harass the customers." In Minnesota there was stiff resistance to this public display and "in Anoka, Minnesota, 'heroic women endured the insults of the saloon-keeper and his wife who poured cold water upon the women from an upper window while they prayed on the sidewalk below. Sometimes beer was thrown on the sidewalk so that they could not kneel there but they prayed.'"  As a result, Minnesotan women were motivated and "formed local societies, which soon united to become the National Woman's Christian Temperance Union in 1874. Women from St. Paul, Minneapolis, Red Wing, and Owatonna organized their first local W.C.T.U. clubs between 1875 and 1877. The Minnesota WCTU began in the fall of 1877. From this point the Minnesota WCTU began to expand throughout the state in both size and interests.

The Minnesota WCTU worked hard to extol the values of the WCTU which included converting new immigrants to American culture or "Americanization."  Bessie Laythe Scovell, a native New Englander that moved to Minnesota in the 1800s and served as president of the Minnesota WCTU chapter from 1897–1909 delivered her 1900 "President's Address", where she expounded on the methods the Minnesota chapter of the WCTU would utilize to accomplish its variety of goals within the state. Scovell adopted what was at the time a "progressive" approach to the issue of immigrants, particularly German and Scandinavian in Minnesota, indulging in alcohol and stated:

We must have a regiment of American workers, who will learn the German language, love the German people, work among the German children and young people until we get them to love clear brains better than beer. There must be others who for the love of country and dear humanity will learn the Scandinavian language and be real neighbors to the many people of this nationality who have come to make homes in America. Again others must learn the French and Italian and various dialects, even, that the truths of personal purity and total abstinence be taught to these who dwell among us. We must feel it a duty to teach these people the English language to put them in sympathy with our purposes and our institutions.

For Scovell and the women of the Minnesota WCTU, speaking English and participating in established American institutions were essential to truly become "American" just as abstaining from alcohol was necessary to be virtuous. By linking language to culture and institutions, Scovell and the WCTU recognized that a multicultural approach would be necessary to communicate values to new immigrants, but did not conclude that multiculturalism was a value in itself. The WCTU viewed the foreign European cultures as a corrupter and despoiler of virtue, hence the excessive drinking.  That is ultimately why it was paramount the immigrants learned English and assimilated.

Prohibition
In 1893, the WCTU switched focus toward prohibition, which was ultimately successful when the 18th amendment to the US Constitution was passed. After prohibition was instituted, WCTU membership declined.

Over the years, different prohibition and suffrage activists had suspected that brewer associations gave money to anti-suffrage activities. In 1919, there was a Senate investigation that confirmed their suspicions. Some members of the United States Brewers Association were openly against the woman's suffrage movement. One member stated, "We have defeated woman's suffrage at three different times."

Although the WCTU was an explicitly religious organization and worked with religious groups in social reform, it protested wine use in religious ceremonies. During an Episcopal convention, it asked the church to stop using wine in its ceremonies and to use unfermented grape juice instead. A WCTU direct resolution explained its reasoning: wine contained "the narcotic poison, alcohol, which cannot truly represent the blood of Christ."

The WCTU also favored banning tobacco. In 1919, the WCTU expressed to Congress its desire for the total abolition of tobacco within five years.

Under Willard, the WCTU supported the White Life for Two program. Under this program, men would reach women's higher moral standing (and thus become woman's equal) by engaging in lust-free, alcohol-free, tobacco-free marriages. At the time, the organization also fought to ban alcohol use on military bases, in Indian reservations, and within Washington's institutions. Ultimately, Willard succeeded in increasing the political clout of the organization because, unlike Annie Wittenmyer, she strongly believed that the success of the organization would only be achieved through the increased politicization of its platform.

Reach of the Woman's Christian Temperance Movement
In the United States, the WCTU was divided along ideological lines. The first president of the organization, Annie Wittenmyer, believed in the singleness of purpose of the organization—that is, that it should not put efforts into woman suffrage, prohibition, etc. This wing of the WCTU was more concerned with how morality played a role during the temperance movement. With that in mind, it sought to save those whom they believed to be of lower moral character. For them, the alcohol problem was one of moral nature and was not caused by the institutions that facilitated access to alcohol.

The second president of the WCTU, Frances Willard, demonstrated a sharp distinction from Wittenmyer. Willard had a much broader interpretation of the social problems at hand. She believed in "a living wage; in an eight-hour day; in courts of conciliation and arbitration; in justice as opposed to greed in gain; in Peace on Earth and Good-Will to Men." This division illustrated two of the ideologies present in the organization at the time, conservatism and progressivism. To some extent, the Eastern Wing of the WCTU supported Wittenmyer and the Western Wing had a tendency to support the more progressive Willard view.

Membership within the WCTU grew greatly every decade until the 1940s. By the 1920s, it was in more than forty countries and had more than 766,000 members paying dues at its peak in 1927.

Classification of WCTU Committee
Reports by Period and Interests

Source:Sample of every fifth Annual Report of the WCTU
Percentages total more than 100 percent due to several interests in some committee reports.

Frances Willard

In 1874 Willard was elected the new secretary of the WCTU. Five years later, in 1879, she became its president. Willard also started her own organization, called the World's Women Christian Temperance Union, in 1883.

After becoming WCTU's president, Willard broadened the views of the group by including woman's rights reforms, abstinence, and education. As its president for 19 years, she focused on moral reform of prostitutes and prison reform as well as woman's suffrage. With the passage of the 19th Amendment in 1920, Willard's predictions that women voters "would come into government and purify it, into politics and cleanse the Stygian pool" could be tested. Frances Willard died in February 1898 at the age of 58 in New York City. A plaque commemorating Willard's election to president of the WCTU in 1879 by Lorado Taft is in the Indiana Statehouse, Indianapolis, Indiana.

Matilda Bradley Carse
 
Matilda B. Carse became an activist after her son was killed in 1874 by a drunk wagon driver. She joined the Chicago Central Christian Woman's Temperance Union to try to eliminate alcohol consumption. In 1878 she became the president of the Chicago Central Christian Woman's Temperance Union, and in 1880 she helped organize the Woman's Temperance Publishing Association, selling the stock to rich women. That same year she also started The Signal; three years later it merged with another newspaper to become The Union Signal. It became the most important woman's newspaper and soon sold more copies than any other newspaper. It was Carse who was driving force behind the construction of Chicago's Temperance Temple.

During her time as president, Carse founded many charities and managed to raise approximately $60,000,000 a year to support them. She started the Bethesda Day Nursery for working mothers, two kindergarten schools, the Anchorage Mission for erring girls, two dispensaries, two industrial schools, an employment bureau, Sunday schools, and temperance reading rooms.

Current status

The WCTU remains an internationally active organization.  In American culture, although "temperance norms have lost a great deal of their power" and there are far fewer dry communities today than before ratification of the Eighteenth Amendment, there is still at least one WCTU chapter in almost every U.S. state and in 36 other countries around the world.

Requirements for joining the WCTU include paying membership dues and signing a pledge to abstain from alcohol.
The pledge of the Southern Californian WCTU, for example, is "I hereby solemnly promise, God helping me, to abstain from all distilled, fermented, and malt liquors, including beer, wine, and hard cider, and to employ all proper means to discourage the use of and traffic in the same." Current issues for the WCTU include alcohol, which the organization considers to be North America's number one drug problem, as well as illegal drugs, and abortion. The WCTU has warned against the dangers of tobacco since 1875. They continue to this day in their fight against those substances they see as harmful to society.

The last edition of the WCTU's quarterly journal, titled The Union Signal, was published in 2015, the main focus of which was current research and information on drugs. Other national organizations also continue to publish.

The WCTU also attempts to encourage young people to avoid substance abuse through participation in three age-divided suborganizations: White Ribbon Recruits for pre-schoolers, the Loyal Temperance Legion (LTL) for elementary school children, and the Youth Temperance Council (YTC) for teenagers.

The White Ribbon Recruits are mothers who will publicly declare their dedication to keeping their babies drug-free. To do this, they participate in the White Ribbon Ceremony, but their children must be under six years of age. The mother pledges "I promise to teach my child the principles of total abstinence and purity", and the child gets a white ribbon tied to its wrist.

The Loyal Temperance Legion (LTL), is another temperance group aimed at children. It is for children aged six to twelve who are willing to pay dues annually to the LTL. Its motto is "That I may give my best service to home and country, I promise, God helping me, Not to buy, drink, sell, or give alcoholic liquors while I live. From other drugs and tobacco I'll abstain, And never take God's name in vain."

The Youth Temperance Council is the final type of group meant for youths and is aimed at teenagers. Its pledge is "I promise, by the help of God, never to use alcoholic beverages, other narcotics, or tobacco, and to encourage everyone else to do the same, fulfilling the command, 'keep thyself pure'."

The World's WCTU
The World's WCTU (WWCTU) is one of the most prominent examples of internationalism, evidenced by the circulation of the Union Signal around the globe; the International Conventions that were held with the purpose of focusing "world attention on the temperance and women's questions, and the appointment of "round-the-world missionaries."  Examples of international Conventions include the one in 1893 scheduled to coincide with the Chicago World's Fair; the London Convention in 1895;  the 1897 one in Toronto; and the Glasgow one in 1910. The first six round-the-world missionaries were Mary C. Leavitt, Jessie Ackermann, Alice Palmer, Mary Allen West, Elizabeth Wheeler Andrew, and Dr Katharine Bushnell.

The ambition, reach and organizational effort involved in the work undertaken by the World's WCTU leave it open to cynical criticism in the 21st century, but there is little doubt that at the end of the 19th century, "they did believe earnestly in the efficacy of women's temperance as a means for uplifting their sex and transforming the hierarchical relations of gender apparent across a wide range of cultures."

South Africa
Amongst the presidents of the Cape Colony WCTU was Georgiana Solomon, who eventually became a world vice-president.

New Zealand

As early as 6 August 1884, under the leadership of Eliza Ann Palmer Brown in Invercargill, a WCTU branch had started in New Zealand. Arriving in January 1885, a prominent American missionary, Mary Leavitt, traveled to Auckland, New Zealand to spread the message of the WCTU. For the next eight years, Leavitt traveled around New Zealand establishing WCTU branches and advocating for women to, "protect their homes and families from liquor, by claiming their rightful voice" and work to end the over-consumption of alcohol through gaining the vote. Working alongside Leavitt was Anne Ward, a New Zealand social worker and temperance activist, who served as the first national president of the WCTU in New Zealand.

Māori women were also active members of the WCTU in New Zealand. In 1911, during the presidency of Fanny Cole, Hera Stirling Munro, Jean McNeish of Cambridge and Rebecca Smith of Hokianga organised a WCTU convention at Pakipaki specifically by and for Māori. Many Māori women signed WCTU-initiated national franchise petitions. Specifically, the 1892 WCTU petition was signed by Louisa Matahau of Hauraki and Herewaka Poata from Gisborne, and the 1893 petition was also signed by Matilda Ngapua from Napier and four other Māori women using European names instead.

The WCTU played a significant role in New Zealand, because it was the only public organisation in the country that could provide women political and leadership experience and training, and as a result, well over half of suffragists at the time were members of the organisation. One of the most notable New Zealand suffragists was Kate Sheppard, who was the leader of the WCTU's franchise department, and advised women in the WCTU to work closely with members of Parliament in order to get their ideas in political discourse. This eventually led to women winning the right to vote in 1893. Some prominent New Zealand suffragists and WCTU members include Kate Sheppard, Learmonth Dalrymple, Meri Te Tai Mangakāhia, Elizabeth Caradus, Kate Milligan Edger, Christina Henderson, Annie Schnackenberg, Anne Ward, and Lily Atkinson.

Canada

The WCTU formed in Canada in 1874, in Owen Sound, Ontario. and spread across Canada. The Newfoundland branch played an important part in campaigning for women's suffrage on the grounds that women were vital in the struggle for prohibition. In 1885 Letitia Youmans founded an organization which was to become the leading women's society in the national temperance movement. Youmans is often credited with spreading the organization across the country. One notable member was Edith Archibald of Nova Scotia. Notable Canadian feminist Nellie McClung was also involved.

Newfoundland 
The Newfoundland chapter of the WCTU formed in September 1890.  Early supporters included Reverend Mr. A.D. Morton, the Methodist minister of Gower Street Church, and local women such as Emma Peters, Lady Jeanette Thorburn, Jessie Ohman, Maria C. Williams, Elizabeth Neyle, Margaret Chancey, Ceclia Fraser, Rev. Mrs. Morton, Mrs. E.H. Bulley, Tryphenia Duley, Sarah (Rowsell) Wright and Fanny Stowe.

The WCTU agitated for women's suffrage in the Dominion especially in the wake of the sacrifices of WW1, but did not see this realized until 1925.

India

The WCTU formed in India was formed in the 1880s. It publishes Temperance Record and White Ribbon, remaining very active today.

Australia

The WCTU began in Australia following visits from Jessie Ackermann in 1889 and 1891; a number of other Christian Temperance and Abstinence Societies existed throughout Australia before that time. Jessie Ackermann acted as the round the world missionary for the American-based World's WCTU, and became the inaugural president of the federated Australasian WCTU, Australia's largest women's reform group. They were active in the struggle for the extension of the franchise to women through promoting suffrage societies, collecting signatures for petitions and lobbying members of parliament. (See, for example, Women's suffrage in Australia.) After visiting New Zealand, Miss Ackermann came to Hobart in May 1889, then toured the mainland for almost 12 months, stopping in Adelaide, Port Augusta, Clare, Kapunda and Burra in June to August, Mount Gambier, Brisbane, Sydney, and Bathurst. She returned for a further visit, including Melbourne in 1891.

In Victoria, weekly temperance conferences were held at the East Melbourne home of Margaret McLean, a founding member and coordinator of the Melbourne branch of the WCTU of Victoria; she was president of the organisation for two periods, 1892–93 and 1899–1907.

The Queensland chapter established itself by 1928 at Willard House, River Road (now Coronation Drive), North Quay, near the Brisbane River.  The state organiser in 1930 was Zara Dare who went on to become one of the first female police officers in Queensland in 1931.

Sweden

The Swedish WCTU, known as Vita Bandet (White Ribbon) was founded by Emilie Rathou in Östermalm in Stockholm in 1900. Rathou was a leading member of the International Organisation of Good Templars, and the pioneer for organizing the WCTU and its local branches in Sweden.

Woman's Temperance Publishing Association
The Woman's Temperance Publishing Association was started in Indianapolis by Wallace but thought up by Matilda B. Carse. They thought there was a need for a weekly temperance paper for women of color. The creators wanted the first board of directors to be seven women who had the same vision as Carse.

Conventions

 1874, Cleveland, Ohio
 1875, Cincinnati, Ohio
 1876, Newark, New Jersey
 1877, Chicago, Illinois
 1878, Baltimore, Maryland
 1879, Indianapolis, Indiana
 1880, Boston, Massachusetts
 1881, Washington, D.C.
 1882, Louisville, Kentucky
 1883, Detroit, Michigan
 1884, St. Louis, Missouri
 1885, Philadelphia, Pennsylvania
 1886, Minneapolis, Minnesota
 1887, Nashville, Tennessee
 1888, New York, New York
 1889, Chicago, Illinois
 1890, Atlanta, Georgia
 1891, Boston, Massachusetts
 1892, Denver, Colorado
 1893, Chicago, Illinois
 1894, Cleveland, Ohio
 1895, Baltimore, Maryland
 1896, St. Louis, Missouri
 1897, Buffalo, New York
 1898, St. Paul, Minnesota
 1899, Seattle, Washington
 1900, Washington, D.C.
 1901, Fort Worth, Texas
 1902, Portland, Maine
 1903, Cincinnati, Ohio
 1904, Philadelphia, Pennsylvania
 1905, Los Angeles, California
 1906, Hartford, Connecticut
 1907, Nashville, Tennessee
 1908, Denver, Colorado
 1909, Omaha, Nebraska
 1910, Baltimore, Maryland
 1911, Milwaukee, Wisconsin
 1912, Portland, Oregon
 1913, Asbury Park, New Jersey
 1914, Atlanta, Georgia
 1915, Seattle, Washington
 1916, Indianapolis, Indiana
 1917, Washington, D. C.
 1918, St. Louis, Missouri
 1919, St. Louis, Missouri
 1920, Washington, D.C.
 1921, San Francisco, California
 1922, Philadelphia, Pennsylvania
 1923, Columbus, Ohio
 1924
 1925, Detroit, Michigan
 1926
 1927
 1928, Boston, Massachusetts

Presidents
The presidents of the WCTU and their terms of office are:

 1874 - 1879 - Annie Turner Wittenmyer
 1879 - 1898 - Frances Willard
 1898 - 1914 - Lillian M. N. Stevens
 1914 - 1925 - Anna Adams Gordon
 1925 - 1933 - Ella A. Boole
 1933 - 1944 - Ida B. Wise
 1944 - 1953 - Mamie White Colvin
 1953 - 1959 - Agnes Dubbs Hays
 1959 - 1974 - Ruth Tibbets Tooze
 1974 - 1980 - Edith Kirkendall Stanley
 1980 - 1988 - Martha Greer Edgar
 1988 - 1996 - Rachel Bubar Kelly
 1996 - 2006 - Sarah Frances Ward
 2006 - 2014 - Rita Kaye Wert
 2014 - 2019 - Sarah Frances Ward
 2019 - Current - Merry Lee Powell

Notable people

A-C

Sarah C. Acheson
Jessie Ackermann
Lucia H. Faxon Additon
Mary Osburn Adkinson
Mary Jane Aldrich
Eunice Gibbs Allyn
Edith Archibald
Ida A. T. Arms
Lily Atkinson
Clara Babcock
Lepha Eliza Bailey
Helen Morton Barker
Frances Julia Barnes
Susan Hammond Barney
Emma Curtiss Bascom
Josephine Cushman Bateham
Emma Pow Bauder
Marion Babcock Baxter
Frances Estill Beauchamp
Emma Lee Benedict 
Anna Smeed Benjamin
Mary Crowell Van Benschoten
Martia L. Davis Berry
Belle G. Bigelow
Lettie S. Bigelow
Suessa Baldridge Blaine
Ellen A. Dayton Blair
Emily Rose Bleby
Astrid Blume
Mary Shuttleworth Boden
Lizzie Borden
Caroline G. Boughton
Emma E. Bower
Euphemia Bridges Bowes
Ada Chastina Bowles
Leah Belle Kepner Boyce
Kate Parker Scott Boyd
Caroline Brown Buell
Helen Louise Bullock
Annie Babbitt Bulyea
Adda Burch
Nelle G. Burger
Emeline S. Burlingame
Cynthia S. Burnett
Woodnut S. Burr
Mary Towne Burt
Lucy Wood Butler
Alice Sudduth Byerly
Alice A. W. Cadwallader
Emor L. Calkins
Matilda Carse
Annie Carvosso
Jennie Casseday
Rebecca Ballard Chambers
Nettie Sanford Chapin 
Sallie F. Chapin
Fanny DuBois Chase
Louise L. Chase
Annetta R. Chipp
Mamie Claflin
Annie W. Clark
Clara Amelia Rankin Coblentz
Cordelia Throop Cole
Julia Colman 
Sara Jane Crafts
Mary Helen Peck Crane
Ella D. Crawford
Belle Caldwell Culbertson
Mary Ann Cunningham
 Nannie Webb Curtis

D-K

Frances Brackett Damon
Lella A. Dillard
Mary L. Doe
Sara J. Dorr
Eva Craig Graves Doughty 
Alice May Douglas
Lavantia Densmore Douglass 
Cornelia M. Dow
Marion Howard Dunham
Harriet Ball Dunlap
Julia Knowlton Dyer
Ida Horton East
Mary G. Charlton Edholm
Margaret Dye Ellis
Lelia Dromgold Emig
Sarah Lindsay Evans
Nellie Blessing Eyster
Mary J. Farnham
Susan Frances Nelson Ferree
Susan Fessenden
Jessie Forsyth
Bertha Fowler
Susanna M. D. Fry
Minnie Rutherford Fuller
Jane Gemmill
Harriet E. Garrison
Ella M. George
T. Adelaide Goodno
Amelia Elizabeth Roe Gordon
Anna Adams Gordon
Elizabeth Putnam Gordon
Charlotte A. Gray
Eva Kinney Griffith
Hattie Tyng Griswold
Sophronia Farrington Naylor Grubb 
Anna M. Hammer
Utako Hayashi
Rebecca Naylor Hazard
S. M. I. Henry
Eliza Trask Hill
Emily Caroline Chandler Hodgin
Clara Cleghorn Hoffman
Lillian Hollister
Jennie Florella Holmes
Mary Emma Holmes
Annabel Morris Holvey
Esther Housh
Emeline Harriet Howe
Mary Hunt
Mary Bigelow Ingham
Eliza Buckley Ingalls
Mary E. Ireland
Hannah M. Underhill Isaac
Katharine Johnson Jackson
Frances C. Jenkins
Therese A. Jenkins
Laura M. Johns
Carrie Ashton Johnson
Mary Coffin Johnson
Ella Eaton Kellogg
Agnes Kemp
Ella B. Kendrick
Narcissa Edith White Kinney
 Janette Hill Knox

L-R

Imogen LaChance
Sarah Doan La Fetra
Mary Torrans Lathrap
Maria Elise Turner Lauder
Louisa Lawson
Olive Moorman Leader
Mary Greenleaf Clement Leavitt
Lilah Denton Lindsey
Margaret Bright Lucas
Nellie V. Mark
Abbie K. Mason
Asa Matsuoka
Harriet Calista Clark McCabe
Mary A. McCurdy
Elizabeth McCracken
Olive Dickerson McHugh
Margaret McLean
Jeanette DuBois Meech
Caroline Elizabeth Merrick
Cornelia Moore Chillson Moots
Mary L. Moreland 
Carrie Nation
A. Viola Neblett 
Angelia Thurston Newman
Della Whitney Norton
Hannah Borden Palmer
Sarah Maria Clinton Perkins
Alice E. Heckler Peters
Belle L. Pettigrew
Esther Pugh
Jennie Phelps Purvis
Emily Lee Sherwood Ragan
Anna Rankin Riggs
Mary A. Ripley
Laura Jacinta Rittenhouse
Elizabeth Lownes Rust

S-Z

Susanna M. Salter
Semane Setlhoko Khama
Kate Sheppard
Katherine Call Simonds
Henrietta Skelton 
Eva Munson Smith 
Mary Bell Smith
Olive White Smith
Georgiana Solomon
Ruth Hinshaw Spray
Amelia Minerva Starkweather 
Susan J. Swift Steele
Emily Pitts Stevens
Lillian M. N. Stevens
Katharine Lente Stevenson
Eliza Daniel Stewart
Jane Agnes Stewart
Mary Ingram Stille
Missouri H. Stokes
Maria Straub
Flora E. Strout
Margaret Ashmore Sudduth 
Lucy Robbins Messer Switzer
Hannah E. Taylor
Eva Griffith Thompson
Mandana Coleman Thorp
Lydia H. Tilton
Anna Augusta Truitt
Alice Bellvadore Sams Turner
Phoebe Jane Babcock Wait
Anne Ward
Elizabeth Jane Ward
Lala Fay Watts
Mary Allen West
M. Ella Whipple
Reah Whitehead
Sophronia Wilson Wagoner
Mary A. Hitchcock Wakelin
Adelaide Cilley Waldron
Mary Evalin Warren
Lucy Hall Washington
Laura Moore Westbrook
Agnes Weston
Mary Sparkes Wheeler
Dora V. Wheelock
Laura Rosamond White
Hannah Tyler Wilcox
Margaret Ray Wickens
Frances Willard
Mary Bannister Willard
Jennie Fowler Willing
Drusilla Wilson
Ella B. Ensor Wilson
Zara A. Wilson
Ida B. Wise
Mary A. Brayton Woodbridge
Caroline M. Clark Woodward
Lenna Lowe Yost

See also

Frances Willard House (Evanston, Illinois)
List of Temperance organizations
List of suffragists and suffragettes
Non-Partisan National Woman's Christian Temperance Union
Scientific Temperance Federation
Temperance movement
Timeline of women's suffrage
White Ribbon Association, similar British organization
Woman's Christian Temperance Union Administration Building
Woman's Christian Temperance Union Fountain
Women's suffrage organizations
Women in the United States Prohibition movement

References

Bibliography
 Chapin, Clara Christiana Morgan. (1895)  Thumb Nail Sketches of White Ribbon Women: Official. Woman's Temperance Publishing Association:  Evanston.

 Dannenbaum, Jed. (1984) Drink and Disorder: Temperance Reform in Cincinnati from the Washingtonian Revival to the WCTU (University of Illinois Press, 1984).

 
 Lamme, Meg Opdycke. (2011) "Shining a calcium light: The WCTU and public relations history." Journalism & Mass Communication Quarterly 88.2 (2011): 245-266.

 Lappas, Thomas John. (2020) In League Against King Alcohol: Native American Women and the Woman’s Christian Temperance Union, 1874–1933 (University of Oklahoma Press, 2020) excerpt
 Mattingly, Carol. (1995) "Woman‐tempered rhetoric: Public presentation and the WCTU." Rhetoric Review 14.1 (1995): 44-61. 

 Parker, Alison M. (1999) " 'Hearts Uplifted and Minds Refreshed': The Woman's Christian Temperance Union and the Production of Pure Culture in the United States, 1880-1930." Journal of Women's History 11.2 (1999): 135-158. online

 Parker, Alison M. (1997). Purifying America: Women, Cultural Reform, and Pro-Censorship Activism, 1873-1933, (U of Illinois Press).
 Sheehan, Nancy M. (1983) " 'Women helping women': The WCTU and the foreign population in the West, 1905–1930." International Journal of Women's Studies (1983) 6(5), 395–411. abstract.
 Sims, Anastatia. (1987) " 'The Sword of the Spirit': The WCTU and Moral Reform in North Carolina, 1883-1933." North Carolina Historical Review 64.4 (1987): 394-415. online

 Tyrrell, Ian. (1986) "Temperance, Feminism, and the WCTU: New Interpretations and New Directions." Australasian Journal of American Studies 5.2 (1986): 27-36. online, historiography
 Tyrrell, Ian. (1991) Woman's World/Woman's Empire: The Woman's Christian Temperance Union in International Perspective 1880-1930, The University of Carolina Press, Chapel Hill and London. 
 Tyrrell, Ian. (2010) Reforming the World: the creation of America's moral Empire, Princeton University Press,  
  Woman's Christian Temperance Union Dept. of Scientific Instruction A History of the First Decade of the Department of Scientific Temperance Instruction in Schools and Colleges of the Woman's Christian Temperance Union: In Three Parts. (1892) Published by G.E. Crosby & Co.

Australia and Canada

 Cook, Sharon Anne. (1995) Through Sunshine and Shadow: The Woman's Christian Temperance Union, Evangelicalism, and Reform in Ontario, 1874-1930 (McGill-Queen's Press-MQUP, 1995), in Canada.
 Cook, Sharon Anne. " 'Sowing Seed for the Master': The Ontario WCTU and Evangelical Feminism 1874-1930." Journal of Canadian studies 30.3 (1995): 175-194.

 Hyslop, Anthea. (1976) "Temperance, Christianity and feminism: The woman's Christian temperance union of Victoria, 1887–97." Historical studies 17.66 (1976): 27-49. in Australia. online

 Sheehan, Nancy M. "Temperance, education and the WCTU in Alberta, 1905-1930." Journal of Educational Thought (JET)/Revue de la Pensée Educative 14.2 (1980): 108-124.
 Tyrrell, Ian. (1983) "International Aspects of the Woman's Temperance Movement in Australia: The Influence of the American WCTU, 1882–1914." Journal of Religious History'' 12.3 (1983): 284-304.

External links

 World Woman's Christian Temperance Union
 Address Before The Second Biennial Convention Of The World's Woman's Christian Temperance Union, by Frances Willard, President (October, 1893)
 Modern History Sourcebook: Woman's Christian Temperance Union: Growth of Membership and of Local, Auxiliary Unions, 1879-1921
 “We Sang Rock of Ages”: Frances Willard Battles Alcohol in the late 19th century, by Frances Willard
 WCTU (Nebraska Chapter) records at the Nebraska State Historical Society
 WCTU in Our Heritage 
 Woman's Christian Temperance Union (Iowa Chapter) records  at the Iowa Women's Archives, The University of Iowa Libraries, Iowa City
 
Ruth Tibbits Tooze Papers, 1938-1940, at the Special Collections and Archives Research Center, Oregon State University Libraries

 
Temperance organizations in the United States
Anti-abortion organizations in the United States
Conservative organizations in the United States
1873 establishments in Ohio
History of women in the United States
Women's organizations based in the United States
Christian women's organizations
Organizations established in 1873
Christianity and society in the United States
International women's organizations
Christian temperance movement
Voter rights and suffrage organizations
Temperance organizations in Canada